The giant sea bass  (Stereolepis gigas) is a fish native to the North Pacific Ocean. Although commonly referred to as a giant sea bass, black sea bass or giant black sea bass, it is actually a wreckfish in the family Polyprionidae rather than in the sea bass family Serranidae.

Characteristics
 
However, in Charles F. Holder's book The Channel Islands of California, published in 1910, the author claims specimens taken from the Gulf of California attained . Aside from its tremendous size, the giant sea bass is also known for its lengthy lifespan. However, some of the largest specimens have been known to exceed 7 ft, and are estimated to be 75 years or older. 
In the eastern North Pacific, its range is from Humboldt Bay, California, to the Gulf of California, Mexico, most common from Point Conception southward. In the northwestern Pacific it occurs around Japan. It usually stays near kelp forests, drop-offs, or rocky bottoms and sand or mudflats. Juveniles of the species are brightly colored in red or orange, however as individuals of the species mature they take on more muddled colors of gray or brown.

Diet
Within kelp forests giant sea bass are the apex predator. Giant sea bass feed on crustaceans, as well as a wide variety of fish. For populations off the coast of California, anchovies and croaker are prominent food sources. Mackerel, sheephead, whitefish, sand bass, and several types of crab also make up the sea bass's diet. Despite their great size and bulky appearance, giant sea bass have been known to move extremely quickly, outstripping bonito.

History and conservation

Recreational fishing of the giant sea bass began in the late 19th century. Caught off the Central and Southern California coasts in the 20th century, the peak catch of the giant sea bass was in 1932. Giant sea bass were once a relatively common inhabitant of Southern California waters, yet in the 1980s, it was facing the threat of local extinction off the California coast.

Giant sea bass were also a popular “big game” quarry for both freediving and scuba spearfishermen. In the 1970s, spearfishing for this species was made illegal by the California Department of Fish and Game. One unfortunate incident precipitated this abrupt change in the law. Several freedivers had taken 7 fish at Santa Cruz Island. Unable to eat nearly a ton of fish, they sold the fish illegally to a fish market in San Pedro. Fish and Game wardens discovered that the fish had been speared by observing the holes and slip tips left behind in their bodies.

By the late 1970s, biologists with the California Department of Fish and Game, recognized that the local population of giant sea bass was in trouble. Actions were taken, resulting in protection from commercial and sport fishing that went into effect in 1982. In 1996, the species was listed as critically endangered by the IUCN. As of 2004, it is suggested that the population size of Giant Sea Bass in California may be increasing as it is under protection; however, there is no hard data to support it. In 2016, the first successful captive breeding of the species occurred at that Aquarium of the Pacific. The total breeding population in California in 2018 is estimated to be around 500 individuals, of which 40 to 50 return to spawn around Catalina Island each year.

Giant sea bass remain understudied in the Mexican portion of its range, although efforts are underway to monitor the population size, genetic connectivity, and fishing pressure along the Pacific coast of the Baja peninsula. More than half of the range of the giant sea bass are within Mexican waters. In Mexico, the giant sea bass is called mero gigante. Prior to 1964, commercial catches of giant sea bass in Mexican waters were above . Within those waters for over half a century the average catch of giant sea bass by Mexican fishermen has been .

References

External links

California Dept. of Fish & Game, species description
 

Polyprionidae
Western North American coastal fauna
Fish described in 1859